A list of films produced in Spain in 1959 (see 1959 in film).

1959

External links
 Spanish films of 1959 at the Internet Movie Database

1959
Spanish
Films